The Aruban Patriot Movement (Movimento Patriótico Arubano, MPA) is a political party in Aruba, formed by dissidents of the Aruban Patriotic Party. 
At the last elections for the Estates, 23 September 2005, the party won 7% of the popular vote and 1 out of 21 seats. The party lost its one seat in the 2009 election.

References

Political parties in Aruba